24S (formerly known as 24 Sèvres) is a French e-commerce luxury fashion company that went live on 6 June 2017. The site was launched by LVMH as an online equivalent to Le Bon Marché, a department store the company had acquired in 1984. Eric Goguey, the chief executive officer, claimed at the time of launch that 24 Sèvres would compete against the online fashion giants Farfetch and Net-a-Porter, with an added focus on the style of Paris. Initially offering womenswear only, the company expanded into menswear in 2019. Also in 2019, the site rebranded from 24 Sèvres to 24S.

References

2017 establishments in France
Online retailers of France